The UK Asian Film Festival, previously known as the London Asian Film Festival, is a British film festival organised by the not-for-profit organisation Tongues on Fire Ltd. and takes place annually in the spring in London. The festival is the leading and longest running South Asian film festival in Europe having completed its 21st edition of the festival in April 2019. The festival caters mainly to South Asian films to date, with main events usually held at either BAFTA or the BFI. At the 2019 film festival awards ceremony at BAFTA 195 Piccadilly, the festival presented Mr Ramesh Sippy with a Lifetime Achievement Flame Award, Radhika Apte with a Making Waves Flame Award and Shabana Azmi with a Revolutionary Icon Golden Flame Award.

History 

Founding directors Dr Pushpinder Chowdhry and Mrs Harvinder Nath started the festival in 1999. The films featured are usually independent or arthouse cinema, as opposed to more popular or mainstream films as the festival has been celebrating Bollywood and Beyond since its conception. The festival's philosophy is to recognize that entertainment is intertwined with important political and social messages and to promote films that tackle challenging issues of society. Special guests from the industry have included Mira Nair (Monsoon Wedding, The Namesake), Gurinder Chadha (Bend It Like Beckham), Aparna Sen (15, park Avenue) and Meera Syal (Anita and Me), actors Shabana Azmi, Nandita Das, Madhur Jaffrey, Kiron Kher, Tannishtha Chatterjee, the Bachchan family and Bollywood legend Helen. In addition to acting and directing, the festival also provides a platform for other aspects within film and arts. The 17th edition of the festival in March 2015 featured the phenomenal choreographer and director Farah Khan with a Choreography Masterclass at Southbank Centre, a Director's Masterclass at Brunei Gallery, SOAS and the UK's first ever Bollywood sing along with Om Shanti Om at the Prince Charles Cinema. The 18th edition of the festival in March 2016 featured an 'In Conversation with...' renowned Indian superstar author and screenwriter Chetan Bhagat (3 Idiots, 2 States, Half-Girlfriend.) More recently in March 2019 the festival opened with an 'In Conversation with..' acclaimed actress and former model Zeenat Aman.

Festival Administration

The festival's Patrons are; Abhishek Bachchan, Prof. Rachel Dwyer, Lord Diljit Rana, Sunita Sangar, Sabiha Sumar and Meera Syal. The Board is made up of Roddy Mullin, Anna Macdonald, Balvinder Mudan, Mamta Kaash, Suniya Qureshi, Pedro Carvalho, Rakhee Joshi, Jaanuja Sriskantha, Aditi Khanna and Ryan Lanji. The Festival Chair Person is Minu Bakshi and Vice Chair Person Nishi Anand. The Festival Directors are Dr Pushpinder Chowdhry, Samir Bhamra (Creative Director) and Saba Syed (Operations Director). The Festival Manager from 2019-2021 was Amandeep Dhillon.

Festival Films 
The 21st Edition of UKAFF was held on 27 March - 4 May 2019, with the festival showcasing in London, Edinburgh, Glasgow, Leicester and Manchester. 
The Short Film Competition Winner was Belmaya Nepali for Educate our daughters, the Youth Curated Choice Award was for film Chegu, Best Documentary to Roopa Barua for Daughters of the Polo God, Best Director to Madhumita for KD, Best Actor to Rasika Duggal for Hamid, Best Film to Hamid and Audience Choice Best Film to Pinky Memsaab.

The 16th Edition of LAFF was held on 1–14 June 2014. The Festival was opened by Nagesh Kukunoor's film on Child Trafficking Lakshmi. The UK Pakistani collaboration Tamanna had its UK premier at the festival on 8 June 2014.

At the 14th LAFF in 2012 Pakistani films won 3 awards for the first time in the festival's history. Bol won three awards: Humaima Malik won Best Film Actress, Shoaib Mansoor won the award for Best Film and Amr Kashmiri won the award for Best New Talent, and Rahat Fateh Ali Khan won Best Music Talent Award for the song Koi Dil Mein from the film Tamanna.

Other stand out films to have premiered at LAFF include Fire, Godmother, Khamosh Pani, Barfi, Bhopal: A Prayer For Rain, Waiting, Manto, Rang Rasiya, Margarita With A Straw and Good Morning Karachi.

External links 
 
 Film and Festival Magazine article on 14th London Asian Film Festival
 Digital Spy review of 14th London Asian Film Festival
 Pakistani films do well at 14th London Asian Film Festival
 Abhishek Bahchan opens the London Asian Film Festival
 Aitmatov Academy photos of LAFF 14th Festival

References

Film festivals in London
Film festivals established in 1999
Annual events in London